Penhill giant is a giant found in English folklore and legends. The giant lived in a fortress on Penhill in Wensleydale, Yorkshire. There are general legends and tales about the giant which claim the giant ate flocks of sheep and terrorized maidens in the local area.

Ian Taylor wrote the book The Giant of Penhill in which he claimed the legends about the giant could have had some basis in fact and the giant may be a lost terrestrial figure. Taylor also linked ley lines to Penhill.

References

English giants
English legendary creatures
Yorkshire folklore